Gornje Impolje (in older sources also Gorenje Impole) is a small settlement in the Municipality of Sevnica in central Slovenia. It lies in the Sava Hills above the right bank of the Sava River in the historical region of Lower Carniola. The municipality is now included in the Lower Sava Statistical Region.

References

External links
Gornje Impolje at Geopedia

Populated places in the Municipality of Sevnica